Dmitry Vlasyevich Aynalov (— 12 December 1939) was a Soviet and Russian art historian, a university professor, a corresponding member of the Saint Petersburg Academy of Sciences (1914), and a member of the Imperial Orthodox Palestine Society. Penned more than 200 scholarly publications, including articles, lectures, reviews.

Early life 
Aynalov was born in Mariupol, Yekaterinoslav Governorate, on 20 February  (8 February O.S.)  1862 in the family of a tradesman Vlasiya Dmitrievich Aynalov. His father was of part Greek descent. Dmitry Aynalov graduated from Mariupol Gymnasium in 1884 and then entered the History and Philology Department of the Novorossiya University in Odessa. He majored in art history and studied under the prominent art critic and archaeologist Nikodim Kondakov. He completed his student thesis in collaboration with Yegor Redin on the topic of the painting of the Saint Sophia Cathedral. It was published in Saint Petersburg in 1889.

Career 
After graduation in 1888 Dmitry Aynalov was assigned to the Saint Petersburg State University. For two years he was preparing to become a full professor in the field of art theory and art history. He accepted the position of an assistant professor at the Kazan University. In 1890-1903 he taught art history of the Classical antiquity and Kievan Rus' at that university's Department of Art Theory and Art History. He visited Italy in order to collect material for his dissertation, entitled The Hellenistic Foundations of the Byzantine Art. He explored the works of art and monuments of Rome, Venice, Naples, Palermo, Parma, Florence and visited other Italian towns. After five years of work he successfully defended the dissertation on 27 November 1895.

From 11 July 1903 he was a professor of the Saint Petersburg State University. He also taught at the Bestuzhev Courses from 5 December 1906. On November 29, 1914 he became a corresponding member at the Academy of Sciences, the Russian Language and Literature Department. By this time he gained many awards, which earned him the rights to nobility. In 1922-1929 he worked at the Hermitage Museum.

Aynalov had an interest in archaeology. As a member of the Russian Archaeological Society, he took part in meetings and fulfilled various requests, e.g. in 1904-1905 as requested by the Moscow Archaeological Society he studied the church architecture of Chernigov. He was particularly interested in Chersonesus and the Crimean Peninsula architecture.

He retired in 1929 due to health issues. In the 1930s Aynalov was arrested, but later rehabilitated. He died in Leningrad in 1939, and was buried at the Volkovo Cemetery with his spouse Nadezhda.

Publications 
 Saint Sophia's Cathedral in Kiev, 1890; in collaboration with Yegor Redin
 The Hellenistic Foundations of Byzantine Art, 1900
 The Christian Chersonesus Monuments, 1901
 Études in the History of Renaissance Art, 1908
 Sketches and Notes on Kievan Rus' Art History, 1914
 History of Kievan Rus' Art, 1915
 Byzantine Paintings of the 14th century, 1917
 Études about Leonardo da Vinci, 1939

References 

1862 births
1939 deaths
People from Mariupol
Soviet art historians
Soviet male writers
20th-century male writers
Russian art historians
Corresponding Members of the Russian Academy of Sciences
Odesa University alumni
Curators from Saint Petersburg
Soviet rehabilitations
Corresponding Members of the USSR Academy of Sciences
Corresponding Members of the Russian Academy of Sciences (1917–1925)
Corresponding members of the Saint Petersburg Academy of Sciences
Historians of Byzantine art
Russian people of Greek descent
Soviet people of Greek descent